Universal D is a record label division under the Universal Music Group in Japan.

Artists and projects
Ahn Jae-wook
Aira Mitsuki
Allen Kim
alpaca
Ayumi Shibata
Bananaman
BIRTH
Brand new vibe
Boys Republic
CNBLUE (distribution only)
cossami
Daijiman Brothers Band
Dragon Zakura OST
Epaksa
F.Cuz
Fingazz
freeTEMPO
FUJI
Gacharic Spin
GoTouchi Idol
THE GOLDEN WET FINGERS
Hallelujah Sisters
Happy Sugar Generation
Hyun Bin
ICTlovely
INFINITE
ISLAND POP
jammin' Zeb
Jang Keun-suk
Ju Ji-hoon
K-pop Dream Concert
Kenichi Asai
Kim Dong-wan
Kishi Bashi
Kouji Ikuma
Kus Kus
LEDApple
Lee Joon-gi
Lee Min-ho
Lee Min-ki
LIL' $
Linda3
LIONOTE
Masayoshi Oishi
Matsumoto Nanami
Megumi Makino
Motoharu Sano
Party Rockets
Saori@destiny
Secret
SECRET 7 LINE
Seiko Shiga
Seo Ji-seok
SHERBERTS
Shiina Yoshiharu
Shin Hye-sung
Teen Top
Tokyo Cheer2 Party
Tomato n'Pine
VIBELUCK
The Yellow Monkey (disbanded)
Yoon Sang-hyun
ZE:A

Distributed labels
 Hybe Labels Japan
 Yoshimoto Music Entertainment

See also
List of record labels

References

External links
 
 

Labels distributed by Universal Music Group
Universal Music Japan